Zaveri is an Indian surname, mainly found among the Gujarati people. The word "Zaveri" (also spelled Jhaveri) means jeweler, and is derived from the Arabic Javahari. Though not all people with surname Zaveri are jewellers by profession, the surname indicates that their ancestors must have been jewelers. Notable people with the name include:

 Shantidas Zaveri (c. 1580s–1659), influential Indian jeweler and merchant during the Mughal era
 Tribhovandas Bhimji Zaveri, who founded the eponymous jewelers
 Anjala Zaveri (born 1972), Indian actress
 Pankaj Manubhai Zaveri, Indian cricketer
 Ashna Zaveri, Indian actress
 Rakesh Jhaveri, Indian spiritual Guru

See also 
 Zaveri Bazaar, the jewelers' market in Mumbai, India

References

Indian surnames
Gujarati people